Crawford is an unincorporated community in Russell County, Alabama, United States. It was the second county seat of Russell County from 1839 to 1868 before it removed to Seale. Crawford had a record population of 3,276 in the 2021 Census. The CCD of Crawford is 84.3 square miles and has 38.9 people per square mile.

Gallery

Demographics

Crawford was listed as an incorporated town on the 1860 U.S. Census when it was the Russell County Seat. It last appeared on the 1880 U.S. Census and has not appeared since. The median age in Crawford is 43.1, which is 20% higher than the Russell County average and 10% higher than the Alabama average. The community consists of about 53% female and 47% male. 

About 8% of Crawford is below the poverty line. The per capita income for Crawford is $31,510, and the median hosehold income is $69,091.

References

Unincorporated communities in Russell County, Alabama
Unincorporated communities in Alabama